German submarine U-416 was a Type VIIC U-boat of Nazi Germany's Kriegsmarine during World War II.

She carried out no patrols. She did not sink or damage any ships.

She was sunk by a Soviet mine on 30 March 1943; raised and sunk again on 12 December 1944 in the Baltic Sea after colliding with a German ship.

Design
German Type VIIC submarines were preceded by the shorter Type VIIB submarines. U-416 had a displacement of  when at the surface and  while submerged. She had two shafts and two  propellers.

U-416 was fitted with five  torpedo tubes (four fitted at the bow and one at the stern), fourteen torpedoes, one  SK C/35 naval gun, 220 rounds, and two twin  C/30 anti-aircraft guns. The boat had a complement of between forty-four and sixty.

Service history
The submarine was laid down on 11 August 1941 at the Danziger Werft (yard) at Danzig (now Gdansk), as yard number 117, launched on 9 May 1942 and commissioned on 4 November under the command of Oberleutnant zur See Christian Reich.

She served with the 8th U-boat Flotilla from 4 November 1942 and the 23rd flotilla from 4 October 1943. She was reassigned to the 21st flotilla on 1 July 1944.

Fate
U-416 was sunk on 30 March 1943 by a mine laid by the Soviet submarine L-3 on 26 August 1942 near Bornholm (eastern Denmark). She was raised on 8 April 1943 and after repairs, used for training. She was in collision with the German minesweeper M 203 and sunk again on 12 December 1944 northwest of Pillau, (Balltiysk) in Russia.

References

Bibliography

External links

German Type VIIC submarines
U-boats commissioned in 1942
U-boats sunk in 1943
U-boats sunk in 1944
U-boats sunk by German warships
U-boat accidents
1942 ships
Ships built in Danzig
World War II submarines of Germany
World War II shipwrecks in the Baltic Sea
Maritime incidents in March 1943
Maritime incidents in December 1944
U-boats sunk by Soviet submarines
U-boats sunk by mines